Janeil Engelstad is an American artist and curator. Her work focuses on the role of the arts and design in addressing social and environmental concerns. In addition to working independently, Engelstad produces projects through her organization Make Art with Purpose (MAP).

Projects

AMPL!FY  
AMPL!FY grew from the national project Dialogues on Race, a project that Engelstad designed and produced through Make Art with Purpose. Participants including artists, graphic designers, activists, organizations and youth created billboards and posters on racial equality issues, which were then discussed in community forums. After the United States Presidential Election, 2016, Engelstad worked with graphic designer Mark Randall (2017 American Institute of Graphic Arts Gold Medalist) to change Dialogues on Race into a project that aimed to address political divisions in a productive way. Project partners of AMPL!FY included the Museum of Arts and Design, New York City Department of Transportation’s Art Program (NYC DOT) and Harlem Stage. Its goal is to create media content and promotion for grassroots organizations working on social and environmental issues. Operating in New York City in 2017 and 2018, AMPL!FY included posters designed by a graphic designer or artist working in partnership with a non-profit organization, installed in the Financial District in Manhattan and in Harlem, using NYC DOT's exhibition display cases. An accompanying exhibition at MAD included participatory public programs that aimed to "amplify" social and climate issues. Educational programs were also produced on site where students used the posters to discuss topics such as criminal justice reform, Islamophobia and disability rights, and discussions of the role of activist art in the political and social history of the United States.

Beyond Borders  
As a visiting artist at the Center for Creative Connections, Dallas Museum of Art (DMA), Engelstad produced Beyond Borders, a project on the links between works of art, focusing on cultures and traditions that are little known or misunderstood. The project was launched at the time of Executive Order 13769 and Executive Order 13780, which affected on travel to the United States, as well as Executive Order 13767 which ordered a wall to be built on Mexico–United States border. Engelstad created a set of laminated cards featuring six works of art from the DMA's permanent collection. The front of each card includes an image of the selected work of art and a phrase that Engelstad wrote or found. Her interpretation of the work of art is on the back of each card. The set of cards, in Spanish and English, also includes a map of the three floors of this tour. Beyond Borders also included public programs for museum visitors.

Art and the environment in Eastern and Central Europe 
Engelstad was guest producer of a special issue of the online edition of the MIT journal ARTMargins, on historical and contemporary environmental art in the former Eastern Bloc countries and their relationship to capitalism, globalization, climate change and the legacy of socialism. Participants included Nina Czlegledy, Maja and Reuben Fowkes, Tamás Kaszás, Marjetica Potrč and Rudolf Sikora. The project included interviews and other forms of interaction with artists and cultural producers concerned with the idea and the material reality of what goes by the name of the "natural environment."

Voices From the Center 
Voices From the Center was an oral history project on changes in Poland, Czech Republic, Slovakia and Hungary since the demolition of the Berlin Wall. The project stemmed from Engelstad’s experience as a Fulbright Scholar teaching at the Academy of Fine Arts and Design, Bratislava, Slovak Republic. Wanting to understand the impact of socialism on individuals and their outlook towards the USA, in relationship to her own experience growing up in the Western side of The Cold War, Engelstad had conversations with people about their lives before and after the fall of the Berlin Wall. Many of the participants, who ranged in age from 45–85, felt that despite the historical attention paid to life during Eastern bloc communism, the profundity of their experiences was being lost to history. Engelstad created Voices From the Center with the intention of including views on socialism in Central Europe from all of the Visegrád Group countries. The project also included contributions from young adults, who had been children when the wall came down, about their views of life in the post-communist era. People from both groups talked about what freedom meant to them and had the opportunity to express their dreams, fears and hopes for themselves, their country and the world. Material from Voices From the Center was exhibited in museums and galleries, public art, libraries, and public talks in Central Europe and the United States and on the project's website.

Peace Room / Make Room for Peace  
Engelstad sent questionnaires to people in living in North America, Europe and the Middle East on their ideas about peace following the September 11 attacks. The material that was sent to Engelstad by the survey participants, including poetry, prose, images and music was collected into a book and was followed by design of a public space with furniture and tableware within the gallery. The exhibition space was used to discuss the many different definitions of peace and the tangibility of peace within individuals and groups. Peace Room / Make Room for Peace was published in the Chicago Tribune newspaper, where readers were asked to contribute their own vision of peace to be designed on their own peace plate. Families, school and church groups, individuals and pairs from the U.S. states of Wisconsin, Illinois and Indiana sent in designs. A panel, consisting of Engelstad, a peace policy professional and editors from the Tribune selected the winning designs.

Peace Signs / Visualizing Violence  
In partnership with Mark Randall of World Studio, Engelstad created and produced a multi-platform media art project called Peace Signs on youth gun violence in San Francisco, Los Angeles, Washington, D.C., New York and Chicago. Each iteration of the project included workshops for high school and college students in design, media literacy and violence prevention. The material and events produced through Peace Signs included billboards, transit posters, exhibitions, public talks and a peace parade.

Identity/Identité  
Produced in collaboration with Canadian artist Deborah Bennett in Montréal and Toronto, the year-long project Identity/Identité was on the relationship between language, cultural identity, and nationalism between the citizens of English and French speaking Canada. Work produced through this project was exhibited in galleries and libraries, and projected from storefronts in Toronto and Montréal. Project partners included Toronto Public Library, University of Toronto, Oboro Art Centre, and Concordia University.

Make Art with Purpose 
In 2010 Engelstad founded Make Art with Purpose (MAP). Working in collaboration and across disciplines, MAP invites communities in the design and production of work to co-produce work on international social and environmental issues.

References

External links 
 Homepage
 Make Art with Purpose 
 Voices From The Center
 The MAP Radio Hour, Engelstad's podcast

Living people
Year of birth missing (living people)
21st-century American women artists
American curators
American women curators
New York University alumni
University of Washington alumni
Artists from Seattle